Turcotte or Turcott or Turquotte is a surname, and may refer to:

Persons
 Alan Turcotte, American politician
 Alex Turcotte (born 2001), American ice hockey player
 Alfie Turcotte (born 1965), American ice hockey player
 Arthur Turcotte (1845–1905), Quebec lawyer 
 Darren Turcotte (born 1968), American hockey player
 Donald L. Turcotte (born 1932), American geophysicist
 Élise Turcotte, Canadian writer
 Gustave-Adolphe-Narcisse Turcotte (1848–1918), Canadian physician and politician
 Jean-Claude Turcotte (1936–2015), Roman Catholic prelate
 Joseph-Édouard Turcotte (1808–1864), Canadian lawyer and politician
 Karine Turcotte (born 1978), Canadian weightlifter
 Katrina Kaif, was originally "Katrina Turquotte"
 Kristin Turcotte, Canadian female curler, 1990 Canadian champion
 Marie-Hélène Turcotte, Canadian film director
 Maryse Turcotte (born 1975), Canadian weightlifter
 Mathieu Turcotte (born 1977), Canadian short track speed skater
 Ron Turcotte (born 1941), retired Canadian jockey 
 Roxane Turcotte (born 1952), Canadian author 
 Sheldon Turcott (1936–2000), Canadian television journalist and news anchor